Oxhill is a small village in County Durham, in England. It is located to the west of Stanley, on the bottom of the hill which leads up to Annfield Plain.   Down the hill to the north are East Kyo and Harperley.   Oxhill contains very little: a few households, a pub called The Ox and the main nursery school for the Stanley area.

Oxhill used to be the site of a major level crossing, allowing access from the former nearby Stanhope and Tyne Railway line to a shunting yard adjacent to nearby South Moor, where coal was loaded for transport to the River Tyne for export.

Notable people 
Hillary Clinton's grandfather, Hugh Rodham, was born at Oxhill in 1879, the son of Jonathan Rodham, a coal miner living in the village. The family emigrated from here to the United States in the 1880s.

References

Villages in County Durham
Stanley, County Durham